Santiago High School is located in Corona, California, United  States and is part of the Corona-Norco Unified School District, serving grades 9 through 12.

Notable alumni
 Blake Barnett, former college football player
Chris Benard, track and field athlete
 Monique Billings, WNBA basketball player
Tony Dye, football coach and former NFL free safety
 Susie Feldman, actress, reality television participant, model, and former wife of actor Corey Feldman
 Tyler Hoechlin, actor
Chance Sisco, MLB baseball player
Brice Turang, MLB baseball player
Aaron Wise, professional golfer on the PGA Tour
 Jacob Wohl, far-right conspiracy theorist and fraudster
 Ethan Zubak, MLS soccer player

References

External links

Public high schools in California
Education in Riverside County, California
Education in Corona, California
Buildings and structures in Corona, California